Cirencester Town railway station was one of three railway stations which formerly served the town of Cirencester, Gloucestershire, England; the others were  and .

History
The line was authorised on 21 June 1836, but took several years to build. The first section to open was that between Swindon and Kemble (where there was no station at first) together with the Cirencester branch; it opened on 31 May 1841.

On 12 September 1874 as the first train from Kemble Junction was entering the station the engine ran off the rails. No passengers were injured.

On 1 July 1924 the station was renamed Cirencester Town. A fire broke out on 7 April 1948 in the packing office when a stove pipe overheated and ignited the ceiling joists. The damage was confined to ceiling timbers. In 1956 some additions to the station were made by Howard Cavanagh, architect to the Western Region of British Railways.  The ticket hall to the left of the main building was rebuilt using Bath stone and oak window frames to harmonise with the original.

The station closed to passengers on 6 April 1964.

The 1841 building, designed by Brunel, which was listed as Grade II on 23 July 1971, is owned by Cotswold District Council. It was reported to be in a poor internal condition in 2016, having been empty since 2012. The original overall roof was removed in 1874.

Routes

References

External links
Cirencester Town Station on navigable 1948 O.S. map
Cirencester Town disused railway station photos

Disused railway stations in Gloucestershire
Former Great Western Railway stations
Railway stations in Great Britain opened in 1841
Railway stations in Great Britain closed in 1964
Cirencester
Grade II listed railway stations
Beeching closures in England
Howard Cavanagh railway stations